Olson may refer to:

 Olson (surname), people with the name Olson
 Sigurd Olson Environmental Institute
 Olson (constructor), a former racing car constructor
 Olson database, also known as zoneinfo database
 "Olson", a song by Boards of Canada.

See also
 Morrison v. Olson, a case before the U.S. Supreme Court
 Olsen (disambiguation)
 Olsson
 Oulson
 Justice Olson (disambiguation)